Hillrise is an Agoura Hills, California residential neighborhood of modern mid-century detached homes that was first developed in 1968 and into the 1970s. It is located immediately west and south of Downtown, cutting it off from the South End. The neighborhood's character has created a rather bohemian culture, and the area is considered one of the most eclectic neighborhoods in Agoura Hills.

A river on the southern edge of the district separates the area from the downtown.

Development 
Hillrise was developed by Barclay-Hollander-Curci and work began on February 26 of 1968. There are 426 homes in Hillrise.

References 

Populated places established in 1968
Neighborhoods in Agoura Hills, California